George Crouch (20 August 1878 – 21 August 1952) was an Australian cricketer. He played in five first-class matches for Queensland between 1903 and 1906.

See also
 List of Queensland first-class cricketers

References

External links
 

1878 births
1952 deaths
Australian cricketers
Queensland cricketers
Cricketers from Greater London